Ben Tristem (born 30 August 1976) is an English online educator on Udemy, entrepreneur and author. Tristem has toured Britain in a motorhome, working online via Internet. The European Space Agency put him forward to Channel 4's 2004 Superhuman Program as a British candidate astronaut.

Early life and education

Tristem was born in London, England. He was educated at Dulwich College. Tristem graduated from Imperial College in London, UK with an honors degree in computer science.

Career
Tristem set up his first business at the age of 15, has flying experience and qualifications in gymnastics, sky diving, trampolining, martial arts, and rock climbing. He has a number of game development courses on Udemy. In 2016 he gave a TEDx talk on "Navigating your learning journey".

References

External links
"The top 10 courses for Brits looking for a better job". The Telegraph
"These guys are making bank by teaching online". Fortune.com
"Man (in a motorhome) on a mission". The Telegraph

21st-century English educators
British male writers
Writers from London
1976 births
Living people
People educated at Dulwich College
Alumni of Imperial College London